William S. Peirce School is a historic school building located in the Southwest Center City neighborhood of Philadelphia, Pennsylvania. It was designed by Irwin T. Catharine and built in 1928–1929. It is a four-story, nine bay, brick building on a raised basement in the Late Gothic Revival-style. It features pilasters with limestone caps and a projecting entrance pavilion with an arched opening.

History
It opened in 1928 as a K-8 school, but elementary grades were dropped in 1988.

It was added to the National Register of Historic Places in 1988.

By 2002 Universal Companies took control of the school.

The school has been closed since 2007, although the building is still owned by the School District of Philadelphia.

References

External links
 

School buildings on the National Register of Historic Places in Philadelphia
Gothic Revival architecture in Pennsylvania
School buildings completed in 1929
Southwest Center City, Philadelphia
Defunct schools in Pennsylvania
1929 establishments in Pennsylvania